Jerome Patrick Burke Mayhew (born 11 April 1970) is a British Conservative Party politician. He has been the Member of Parliament (MP) for Broadland in Norfolk since the 2019 general election.

Early life and career
Mayhew is the son of Patrick Mayhew (latterly Baron Mayhew of Twysden), a former Conservative cabinet minister, and the Reverend Jean Elizabeth Mayhew OBE. He studied at Tonbridge School, University of Edinburgh (where he received an MA Hons) and Cranfield University. He was called to the Bar at Middle Temple in 1995, and from that year until 2006, worked in practice as a barrister, based at 1 Temple Gardens.

He was a director of the Go Ape (Adventure Forest Ltd) adventure park company from 2006 to 2009, and its managing director from 2009 to 2018.

Political career
He was selected as the Conservative candidate for the safe seat of Broadland in November 2019, after the former MP, Keith Simpson, chose not to stand for re-election. He was elected to Parliament at the 2019 general election, and elected to the Environmental Audit Select Committee in 2020.

Mayhew is a member of the Environmental Audit Committee. He supports the use of offshore wind farms in East Anglia. In reference to the wind projects Norfolk Vanguard and Norfolk Boreas he says, "offshore wind projects like these are essential to ensure that we can maintain a reliable supply chain and job opportunities this project will bring to East Anglia."

In December 2021, plans were submitted for an asylum seeker processing facility to be set up in Broadland which would house up to 200 lone-male asylum seekers while their applications were assessed. There was strong local opposition to this move and Mayhew joined with residents to launch a campaign against this application on the basis that the site was too remote and wholly unsuitable for asylum seekers. After extensive lobbying with the Home Office by Mayhew and his residents, the plans were dropped and the Home Office conceded to their campaign.

In January 2022, Mayhew was appointed to sit as a British Delegate for the Committee on Political Affairs and Democracy on the Council of Europe.  Mayhew's work on the Council of Europe has included supporting the expulsion of Russia from the Council in response to their invasion of Ukraine. In March, Mayhew became a member of the Backbench Business Committee and in the July he was appointed as a member to the Public Accounts Commission in Parliament.

Mayhew was made Parliamentary Private Secretary (PPS) to Thérèse Coffey, Secretary of State for Environment, Food and Rural Affairs, following the reshuffle when Rishi Sunak became Prime Minister in October 2022.

Personal life 
In 2001, Mayhew married Kate Louise; the couple have a son and two daughters. He lists his recreations in Who's Who as sailing and Ireland. He is a member of the South Cork Sailing and Royal Harwich Yacht clubs.

References

External links

Living people
Conservative Party (UK) MPs for English constituencies
Alumni of the University of Edinburgh
Mayhew family
Sons of life peers
UK MPs 2019–present
1970 births